Sume may refer to:

Places
Sumé, Brazil
Šume (Ivanjica), Serbia
Šume (Topola), Serbia

Sume Island, Zanzibar Archipelago, Tanzania
Ricardo Detomasi Airport (ICAO airport code: SUME), Uruguay

Persons
Abdullah Elyasa Süme (born 1983), Turkish soccer footballer
Cahit Süme (born 1972), Turkish boxer

Other uses
Sume (band), Greenlandic rock band
Sume (수메), a tool; part of the 호미 - homi (tool)

See also

 
 Sum (disambiguation)
 Soum (disambiguation)
 Sumi (disambiguation)
 Sumie (disambiguation)
 Sumy (disambiguation)